The men's 67 kg competition at the 2019 World Weightlifting Championships was held on 19 and 20 September 2019.

Schedule

Medalists

Records

Results

New records

References

Results 

Men's 67 kg